José Américo de Almeida (January 10, 1887, in Areia – March 10, 1980, in João Pessoa) was a Brazilian writer, a politician, a lawyer and a teacher.

Bibliography 
 Reflexões de um Cabra, 1922
 A Paraíba e seus Problemas, 1923
 A Bagaceira, 1928
 O Boqueirão, 1935
 Coiteiros, 1935
 Ocasos de Sangue, 1954
 Discursos de seu Tempo, 1964
 A palavra e o Tempo, 1965
 O Ano do Nego, 1968
 Eu e Eles, 1970
 Quarto Minguante, 1975
 Antes que me Esqueça, 1976
 Sem me Rir, sem Chorar, 1984

References 

1887 births
1980 deaths
Brazilian male writers
People from Paraíba
Vargas Era

Candidates for Vice President of Brazil